The 2022–23 Maryland Eastern Shore Hawks men's basketball team represented the University of Maryland Eastern Shore in the 2022–23 NCAA Division I men's basketball season. The Hawks, led by third-year head coach Jason Crafton, played their home games at the Hytche Athletic Center in Princess Anne, Maryland as members of the Mid-Eastern Athletic Conference.

Previous season
The Hawks finished the 2021–22 season 11–16, 6–8 in MEAC play to finish in a tie for sixth place. In the quarterfinals of the MEAC tournament, they were defeated by North Carolina Central. They were invited to The Basketball Classic, where they would lose to Coastal Carolina in the first round.

Roster

Schedule and results

|-
!colspan=12 style=| Regular season

|-
!colspan=9 style=| MEAC tournament

Sources

References

Maryland Eastern Shore Hawks men's basketball seasons
Maryland Eastern Shore Hawks
Maryland Eastern Shore Hawks men's basketball
Maryland Eastern Shore Hawks men's basketball